Maxine's Tap Room is a historic bar in Fayetteville, Arkansas.

Original Bar
Located on 107 N. Block Ave. It is one of the oldest bars in Northwest Arkansas. Marjorie Maxine Miller opened the bar in 1950 when she was 24 years old with money she borrowed from her parents. She managed to pay her parents back within the year. In 1963 she tore down the old wooden building in which the bar had been located and had the current building—a long, narrow brick structure—built in its place. This was more than likely a business decision aimed at limiting break-ins. Other examples of Miller's shrewd business style include keeping a club behind the bar, having only a pay phone available, and trying to hire football players as employees so the team would follow as patrons, a business style that led to the bar's longevity and success. Adding to the Tap Room's charm were a -long bar that stretched nearly the entire length of the building and dominated the room, an old coin-operated cigarette machine, a juke box that still played 45s, and a deer head adorned with Mardi Gras beads, sunglasses and a tie. Miller was a constant figure behind the cash register for 50 years until her health started to decline around 2000. She died at age 82 in May 2006. A month later the Tap Room caught fire. Due to lack of insurance the bar was closed for over a year, reopening in August 2007. Most of the furniture inside the bar was replaced, including the bar. The exposed rafters darkened by the fire were simply painted black, and a skylight was installed where the roof had burned through. Considerable efforts were made to retain many things that had been in the bar for a very long time, such as the older lights and signs.

Cocktail Bar

In March 2013 the bar was redeveloped into cocktail lounge under a partnership with Rebekah Champagne (Terra Tots), Matt Champagne (Hammer And Chisel), and Ben Gitchel and Hannah Withers (Little Bread Co.) all Block street businesses. The actual ownership of Maxine's remains in the family in the hands of Maxine's great niece, Andrea Foren.
.

References

Maxine's Tap Room - Fayetteville, AR

External links
 

Drinking establishments in Arkansas
History of Arkansas
Buildings and structures in Fayetteville, Arkansas
1950 establishments in Arkansas